The 2022 LPGA of Japan Tour was the 54th season of the LPGA of Japan Tour, the professional golf tour for women operated by the Japan Ladies Professional Golfers' Association.

Leading money winner was Miyū Yamashita with ¥235,020,967. She also won the Mercedes Ranking, had the highest scoring average and finished most often (21 times) inside the top-10.

Schedule
The results of the season are given in the table below. "Date" is the end date of the tournament. The number in parentheses after winners' names shows the player's total number wins in official money individual events on the LPGA of Japan Tour, including that event.

Events in bold are majors.
^ The Toto Japan Classic was co-sanctioned with the LPGA Tour.

References

External links

2022
2022 in women's golf
2022 in Japanese sport